Aaron ben Isaac Hamon was an 18th-century doctor and printer. He served as physician to the Ottoman royal court.

References

External links

18th-century physicians from the Ottoman Empire
18th-century printers
Jews from the Ottoman Empire
Year of birth missing
Year of death missing